Haplochorema is a small genus of flowering plants in the ginger family, Zingiberaceae. It has 6 known species, all native to the islands of Borneo and Sumatra in Southeast Asia:

 Haplochorema decus-sylvae  – Borneo
 Haplochorema extensum  – Sarawak
 Haplochorema latilabrum  – Borneo
 Haplochorema magnum  – Sarawak
 Haplochorema pauciflorum  – Sarawak
 Haplochorema sumatranum  – Sumatra

References

Zingiberoideae
Zingiberaceae genera